Maider Tellería Goñi (born July 14, 1973 in San Sebastián) is a former Spanish field hockey player. She was a member of the gold medal-winning Women's National Team at the 1992 Summer Olympics in Barcelona.

The defender also competed in the women's tournament at the 1996 Summer Olympics in Atlanta (finishing in last place), and in the 2000 Summer Olympics Women's Tournament in Sydney, where Spain finished fourth, losing in the bronze medal game to the Netherlands. Her last Olympic appearance came at the 2004 Summer Olympics in Athens, where the team finished the women's tournament in 10th place.

Team history
Ikastola Zurriola
Club Lagunak
Real Sociedad
Club de Campo Villa de Madrid
Sardinero de Santander

References

External links
 

1973 births
Spanish female field hockey players
Olympic field hockey players of Spain
Field hockey players at the 1992 Summer Olympics
Field hockey players at the 1996 Summer Olympics
Field hockey players at the 2000 Summer Olympics
Field hockey players at the 2004 Summer Olympics
Living people
Olympic gold medalists for Spain
Olympic medalists in field hockey
Medalists at the 1992 Summer Olympics
Field hockey players from the Basque Country (autonomous community)
Sportspeople from San Sebastián